Dhigurah as a place name may refer to:
 Dhigurah (Alif Dhaal Atoll) (Republic of Maldives)
 Dhigurah (Gaafu Alif Atoll) (Republic of Maldives)
 Dhigurah (Shaviyani Atoll) (Republic of Maldives)
 Dhigurah (Noonu Atoll) (Republic of Maldives)